Jie Yang is a computer engineer at the National Science Foundation in Arlington, Virginia. He was named a Fellow of the Institute of Electrical and Electronics Engineers (IEEE) in 2013 for his contributions to multimodal human–computer interaction.

References

Fellow Members of the IEEE
Living people
Year of birth missing (living people)
Place of birth missing (living people)